Margaret Corbin Monument is a monument and United States Military Academy Cemetery, in honor of Margaret Corbin (November 12, 1751 – January 16, 1800), a heroine of the American Revolution.  She died in Highland Falls, New York and was buried near the Hudson River. 

In 1926, remains believed to be hers were disinterred and reburied near the entrance to the West Point Cemetery by the Daughters of the American Revolution. However, a 2017 study revealed that these were instead the remains of an unknown man; the location of Corbin's remains is unknown.

Other memorials
There is a memorial dedicated to Corbin in Fort Tryon Park in Manhattan, New York City, near the location of the Battle of Fort Washington. Margaret Corbin Circle, just outside the entrance to the park, is named after her, as is Margaret Corbin Drive, which connects the circle through the park to the Henry Hudson Parkway.

References

Monuments and memorials at West Point
1926 sculptures
Bronze sculptures in New York City
Monuments and memorials to women